The 40th Venice Biennale, held in 1982, was an exhibition of international contemporary art, with 38 participating nations. The Venice Biennale takes place biennially in Venice, Italy. No prizes were awarded this year or in any Biennale between 1968 and 1986.

References

Bibliography

Further reading 

 
 
 
 
 
 
 
 
 
 
 
 
 
 
 
 
 
 
 
 
 
 
 
 
 
 
 
 

1982 in art
1982 in Italy
Venice Biennale exhibitions